Mesoptiliinae is a subfamily of true weevils in the family Curculionidae. There are at about 23 genera and 40 described species in Mesoptiliinae.

Genera
These 23 genera belong to the subfamily Mesoptiliinae:

 Aethemagdalis Zimmerman, 1994 c g
 Allolaemosaccus Zimmerman, 1994 c g
 Allomagdalis Kuschel, 1950 c g
 Apocnemidophorus Hustache, 1937 c g
 Atopomagdalis Zimmerman, 1994
 Carcilia Roelofs, 1874 c g
 Cnemidontus Schenlding, 1935 c g
 Corynodoceras Kuschel, 1950 c g
 Eumagdalis K. Daniel, 1903 c g
 Habromagdalis Kuschel, 1950 c g
 Heteromagdalis Elgueta, 1985 c g
 Laemosaccellus Zimmerman, 1994 c g
 Laemosaccodes Voss, 1937 c g
 Laemosaccus Schoenherr, 1823 i c g b
 Magdalis Germar, 1817 i c g b
 Melaemosaccus Zimmerman, 1994 c g
 Mesoptilius Labram & Imhoft, 1845 c g
 Micromagdalis Kuschel, 1950 c g
 Neolaemosaccus Hustache, 1937 c g
 Neomagdalis Kuschel, 1950 c g
 Notomagdalis Zimmerman, 1994 c g
 Prionomagdalis Kuschel, 1955 c g
 Trichomagdalis Fall, 1913 i c g b

Data sources: i = ITIS, c = Catalogue of Life, g = GBIF, b = Bugguide.net

References

Further reading

External links

 

Weevils